Greenland is the world's largest island and an autonomous territory within the Kingdom of Denmark.

Greenland or Greenlands may also refer to:

People
Greenland (surname)

Places

Australia
Greenlands, New South Wales (Singleton Council), see Singleton Council
Greenlands, New South Wales (Snowy Monaro Regional Council), see Snowy Monaro Regional Council#Towns and localities
Greenlands, Queensland

Barbados
Greenland, Barbados, a village in the parish of Saint Andrew

Canada
Greenland, Nova Scotia, a community in Annapolis County

United Kingdom
Greenland, County Antrim, a townland in the civil parish of Larne, County Antrim, Northern Ireland
Greenland Dock, in London
Greenlands, Buckinghamshire, a country house in Buckinghamshire
Greenlands, Worcestershire

United States
Greenland, Arkansas, in Washington County
Greenland, Colorado, in Douglas County
Greenland, Michigan, in Ontonagon County
Greenland, New Hampshire, in Rockingham County
Greenland, Ohio, an unincorporated community
Greenland, West Virginia, in Grant County
Greenland Hills, Dallas, Texas, in Dallas County

Arts, entertainment, and media

Film
Greenland (film), a 2020 American film

Music
Greenland (album), 2006 album by Cracker
"Greenland", a song by The Wedding Present from Going, Going...
"Greenland", a song by Herbert Grönemeyer from Chaos
"Greenland", a song by Caravels from Floorboards

Literature
Greenland (1988 play), by English playwright Howard Brenton
Greenland (2009 play), by Canadian playwright Nicolas Billon
Greenland (2011 play), by English playwrights Moira Buffini, Penelope Skinner, Matt Charman and Jack Thorne

Fauna
Greenland cod, Gadus ogac
Greenland Dog, husky breed
Greenland halibut, Reinhardtius hippoglossoides
Greenland shark, Somniosus microcephalus

Other uses
GREENLAND, the callsign of the airline, Air Greenland
Greenland (European Parliament constituency), a European Parliament constituency from 1979 to 1984
, a number of ships with this name
Greenland Holdings, Chinese real-estate corporation
Greenland national football team, the national team of Greenland (not a member of FIFA)

See also
"Greeneland", a literary setting typical of the novels of Graham Greene: a poor, hot, and dusty tropical backwater.
Greenland Township (disambiguation)
Gronland (disambiguation)